Russell Sansom (born 27 September 1956) is a South African cricketer. He played in one List A and three first-class matches for Border in 1977/78 and 1978/79.

See also
 List of Border representative cricketers

References

External links
 

1956 births
Living people
South African cricketers
Border cricketers
Cricketers from East London, Eastern Cape